Dragan Starčević (born 1 July 1977) is a Serbian football goalkeeper.

Career
Born in Loznica, Starčević played with Kneževac Kijevo, BSK Borča, Drobeta-Turnu Severin, Laktaši, Novi Pazar and Posavac before he joined Donji Srem. Playing for Donji Srem between 2011 and 2016, Starčević made 4 Serbian SuperLiga and almost 40 Serbian First League appearances. In the meantime, he was also playing with Radnički Stobex and Sremac Vojka. In summer 2016, Starčević moved to Sopot.

References

External links
 Dragan Starčević Stats at utakmica.rs 
 

1977 births
Living people
Sportspeople from Loznica
Association football goalkeepers
Serbian footballers
FK BSK Borča players
FK Novi Pazar players
FK Donji Srem players
FK Radnički Klupci players
Serbian First League players
Serbian SuperLiga players
Serbian expatriate footballers
Expatriate footballers in Romania
FC Drobeta-Turnu Severin players
Expatriate footballers in Bosnia and Herzegovina
FK Laktaši players
FK Borac Banja Luka players